Cryptobatrachus fuhrmanni (common name: Fuhrmann's backpack frog) is a species of frog in the family Hemiphractidae. It is endemic to Colombia and occurs on all three Andean cordilleras: it is found on the eastern slope of the Cordillera Occidental, northern and eastern flanks of the Cordillera Central, and the western slope of the Cordillera Oriental. The specific name fuhrmanni honors Otto Fuhrmann, Swiss zoologist and helmintologist.

Description
Adult males measure  and adult females  in snout–vent length. The snout is short. The tympanum is small and not sexually dimorphic. The dorsolateral folds are thin. Skin on the dorsum is finely granular with scattered larger warts. The fingers have no webbing. The finger and toe tips bear expanded disks. Subarticular adhesive pads are present.

Female frogs carry the eggs on their back. The eggs have direct development, hatching as froglets (i.e., there is no free-living larval stage).

Habitat and conservation
Cryptobatrachus fuhrmanni can be threatened by habitat loss caused by agriculture and logging, but this species tolerates some habitat perturbation. It is present in the Reserva Regional Bosque de Florencia in Caldas.

References

fuhrmanni
Amphibians of the Andes
Amphibians of Colombia
Endemic fauna of Colombia
Taxa named by Mario Giacinto Peracca
Amphibians described in 1914
Taxonomy articles created by Polbot